Ian Young may refer to:

 Ian Young (academic) (born 1957), Australian academic
 Ian Young (athlete) (1911–2003), Scottish athlete
 Ian Young (basketball) (born 1981), Trinidadian basketball player
 Ian Young (footballer) (1943–2019), Scottish footballer
 Ian Young (marathoner), British marathon runner
 Ian Young (writer) (born 1945), Canadian author and poet
 Ian A. Young, Australian-born electronic engineer at Intel
 Ian Robert Young (1932–2019), British medical imaging researcher and inventor
 Ian Young (cricketer), captain of Scottish under-19 team 2004